CCCC or C.C.C.C may refer to:

Education
Caroline Chisholm Catholic College, Melbourne, Australia
Cape Cod Community College, West Barnstable, Massachusetts, US
Central Carolina Community College, North Carolina Community College System, US
Clark County Community College, Clark County, Nevada, US
Cloud County Community College, Kansas, US
Collin College, formally the Collin County Community College District, Texas, US
Conference on College Composition and Communication
Corpus Christi College, Cambridge, a college of the University of Cambridge, Cambridgeshire, England

Organizations
Cheque and Credit Clearing Company Limited
C.C.C.C. (band), a Japanese noise music band
China Communications Construction Company
Coalition for Compassionate Care of California

Religion
 Christ Church Cathedral Choir
 Compendium of the Catechism of the Catholic Church
Conservative Congregational Christian Conference, a religious denomination in North America
 Community Catholic Church of Canada

Sports
 Cambridgeshire County Cricket Club
 Cheshire County Cricket Club
 Cornwall County Cricket Club
 Cumberland County Civic Center an arena located in Portland, Maine
 Cumbria County Cricket Club

Other uses
CcCc (almost always written in Cyrillic script), means Само слога Србина спасава, or SSSS for Samo sloga Srbina spasava (Only Unity Saves the Serbs), a Serbian unofficial national motto
Center City Commuter Connection, commonly referred to as "the commuter tunnel", a passenger railroad tunnel in Center City, Philadelphia, Pennsylvania
CCCC Miami, proposed skyscraper
 C and C++ Code Counter, a software tool for the analysis of source code, see Static program analysis

See also

Contra Costa Community College District, also known as CCCCD
C4 (disambiguation)
4C (disambiguation)
C (disambiguation)